Where the Lilies Bloom is a 1974 American drama film adaptation of the novel by the same name, written by Bill and Vera Cleaver. The film was produced by Robert B. Radnitz and directed by William A. Graham in Watauga County (towns of Boone and Blowing Rock), Ashe County (towns of West Jefferson and Lansing), and in Avery County (towns of Elk Park and Banner Elk), North Carolina. Soundtrack music is by Earl Scruggs.
 
Children from local elementary schools were recruited to act in the film.

As of 2020, it is streaming free on Amazon Prime. On July 19, 2022, it was released on both DVD and 1080p Blu-ray.

Plot
The Luther family are poor sharecroppers living in the mountains of North Carolina. The father, Roy Luther (Rance Howard) is sickly and asks the second eldest daughter, Mary Call (Julie Gholson) to take over his role of father when he passes on. He instructs her not to tell anyone when he dies as doctors, undertakers and preachers "just take money." Should the authorities discover he is dead, the children would be split up and put in foster homes since none of them are of legal age. Their landlord Kiser Pease, (Harry Dean Stanton), is interested in marrying the eldest daughter Devola (Jan Smithers). Roy Luther won't allow the marriage and makes Mary Call promise she won't let it happen after he dies. Mary Call and younger brother Romey (Matthew Burril) help Kiser when he is sick with pneumonia and Kiser agrees to sign the land back over to the Luther family.

When Roy Luther dies, the children bury him on a mountainside in an unmarked grave, then go to elaborate lengths to keep anyone from finding out he is dead. The children rehearse over and over about what to say if asked about their father. Kiser continues his courtship of Devola with Mary Call doing everything she can to thwart his pursuit of her.

The Luther children scrimp and do all they can to eke out a living for themselves and even sell roots and herbs gathered from their land to the local pharmacist to use in medicines. Mary Call takes refuge in her journal, and the essays she writes for school assignments catch the eye of her teacher who urges her not to waste her talent with words by settling for "a life in the hills," obviously implying that Mary Call should pursue a career as an author.

When Kiser lands in the hospital after having been hit by a truck, his nosy sister Goldie comes to the Luther house and demands they vacate the property. She says the paper that Kiser signed giving Luther's back their land is worthless and orders them out in 48 hours. With no options left, a desperate Mary Call visits Kiser in the hospital and offers herself to him in marriage. Kiser would rather marry Devola and a distraught Mary Call blurts out that Roy Luther is dead. She threatens to kill Kiser if he tells anyone and storms out. Finally, Mary Call agrees to let Kiser marry Devola. Mary Call realizes that Kiser was not so bad after all. After Kiser and Devola marry, the entire Luther family live together in Kiser and Devola's home.

Cast
 Julie Gholson as Mary Call
 Jan Smithers as Devola
 Matthew Burril as Romey
 Helen Harmon as Ima Dean
 Harry Dean Stanton as Kiser Pease
 Rance Howard as Roy Luther
 Tom Spratley as Mr. Connell
 Helen Bragdon as Mrs. Connell
 Alice Beardsley as Goldie Pease
 Sudie Bond as Miss Fleetie
 Bob Cole as Hyder Graybeal
 Martha Nell Hardy as Rose Graybeal
 Resi Sinclair as Alma Graybeal 
 Gregg Parrish as Gaither Graybeal
 Janine Hughes as First Girl
 Karen Moody as Second Girl
 Tom Guinn as Buck Morris 
 George Stenhouse as Minister (as Rev. George Stenhouse)

Development 
This is the second film produced by Robert B. Radnitz and Mattel.

References

External links
 
 
 
 
 

1974 films
Films set in Appalachia
Films shot in North Carolina
1974 drama films
United Artists films
Films based on American novels
Films directed by William Graham (director)
1970s English-language films